Ranunculus cassubicus is a species of flowering plant belonging to the family Ranunculaceae.

Its native range is Southeastern and Eastern Europe to Western Siberia and Central Asia.

References

cassubicus